The Communist Control Act of 1954 (68 Stat. 775, 50 U.S.C. §§ 841–844) is an American law signed by President Dwight Eisenhower on August 24, 1954, that outlaws the Communist Party of the United States and criminalizes membership in or support for the party or "Communist-action" organizations and defines evidence to be considered by a jury in determining participation in the activities, planning, actions, objectives, or purposes of such organizations.

Background 

Created during the period of the Second Red Scare (1946–1954), the act was one of many bills drafted with the intention of protecting the American government from the threat posed by international communists. During this time, some argued that "the pursuit of subversive aims even by peaceful means should [have been] outlawed". Thus, many opposed communism because of its explicitly declared and historically demonstrable goal to undermine liberal democracy. In the words of Ernest van den Haag, there was "no place in democracy for those who want to abolish [it] even with a peaceful vote".

Act 

The Communist Control Act was originally proposed as an amendment to the Internal Security Act of 1950, which had sought to combat the spread of communism in labor unions. Apart from its secondary focus which concentrated on the illegality of "communist front organizations" (i.e. labor unions), the bill was drafted with the intention of tackling the root of pro-communist sentiment in the United States: the Communist Party. In its second section, the CCA of 1954 portrayed the American Communist Party as an "agency of a hostile foreign power." The Party was described as "an instrumentality of a conspiracy to overthrow the government," and as a "clear, present, and continuing danger to the security of the United States." The Act made membership to the Communist Party a criminal act and stipulated that all Party members would be sanctioned with up to a $10,000 fine or imprisonment for five years or both if they failed to register with the U.S. Attorney General as such. Additionally, according to the third section, the Communist Party would be deprived of "the rights, privileges, and immunities of a legal body."

The Internal Security Act of 1950 had defined two types of "communist organizations." Senator Butler later proposed a bill aimed at the removal of Communists from leadership positions in labor unions, adding a third class, that of "communist-infiltrated organizations." Afterwards, Democratic Senator Humphrey put forward a substitute to that bill with the intention of directly tackling the "root of evil," the Communist Party members. Through an amendment by Senator Daniel, both the Butler and Humphrey bills were merged into one, winning unanimous approval in the Senate from both Democrats and Republicans.

Support 

The overwhelming support provided by the liberals has attracted much attention from historians such as Mary McAuliffe. McAuliffe argues that the perceived gravity of the threat of Communism during the Cold War led some liberals to ignore the fact that the CCA suspended the citizenship rights of the Communist Party members. Most liberal Democrats did not even offer a token opposition to the Act; on the contrary, they ardently supported it. McAuliffe further acknowledges that the Act "served to avert possible disaster for individual politicians" who feared being labeled as Communists for their left-minded ideas. In the words of Senator Humphrey, "the amendment [was sought] to remove any doubt in the Senate as to where [Democrats and liberals] [stood] on the issue of Communism." An article published in the Michigan Law Review in 1955 suggested that the Communist Control Act was a "dramatic political gesture" rather than a genuine attempt to "kill Communism at its root."

McAuliffe underlines the anomalies surrounding the Act; in particular, the Act was unorthodox since it bypassed the usual process of committee hearings and deliberations and was immediately introduced to the Senate floor. The Act has no recorded legislated history, undoubtedly because it was rush-printed in the early hours of the morning. In 1955, an outraged American Civil Liberties Union characterized it as "a mockery of... [Americans’] most basic constitutional guarantees." Mary S. McAuliffe commented that use of the Communist Control Act of 1954 was an illustration of "how deeply McCarthyism penetrated American society."

Controversy 

There was much controversy surrounding the Act. The Federal Bureau of Investigation and its Director, J. Edgar Hoover, opposed the bill on the count that it would have forced the Communist movement underground. In addition, the Michigan Law Review argued that the politically charged Act was plagued by a number of constitutional problems which would have undermined its effectiveness. The Yale Law Journal lauded the Act as the "most direct statutory attack on internal communism yet undertaken [by 1955] by Congress," but stressed the "haste and confusion of the Act’s passage" which led to many "vague and ambiguous provisions." The incongruity of its provisions, a grave constitutional defect, was in part attributed to obscure language. For example, the nature of the "rights, privileges, and immunities" to be terminated by the Act was never explicitly stated as relating to state or federal jurisdiction. Also, the Yale Law Journal underlined a number of instances during which a literal interpretation of key passages would have caused entire sections to fall because of the use of comprehensive, unspecific language. McAuliffe notes that, because of these complications, the Act was never "used as a major weapon in the legislative arsenal against Communism," apart from two minor cases in the states of New York and New Jersey.

Other 

The House of Representatives also made some additions to the bill, notably a section which listed the criteria for "determining what constitut[ed] membership in the Party and related organizations."

Further history 

In 1973, a federal district court in Arizona decided that the act was unconstitutional, and Arizona could not keep the party off the ballot in the 1972 general election (Blawis v. Bolin). In 1961, the Supreme Court of the United States ruled that the act did not bar the party from participating in New York's unemployment insurance system (Communist Party v. Catherwood)

See also 
 Communist registration acts
 Espionage Act of 1917
 Mitchell v. Donovan
 Anti-communism
 Criticisms of communism
 McCarthyism

Notes

External links 
Full text of the Communist Control Act of 1954

1954 in law
Anti-communism in the United States
McCarthyism
United States federal criminal legislation
83rd United States Congress
Political repression in the United States